The Dimuhe River Bridge is a suspension bridge near Liupanshui, Guizhou, China. The bridge is part of the G56 Hangzhou–Ruili Expressway between Liupanshui and Bijie and was opened in 2016.

Although Dimuhe River Bridge is officially 360 metres high, the bridge crosses over a shallow reservoir leaving 340 meters of height from the deck to the lake surface when the reservoir is full. The reservoir is along the Sancha River, the headwaters of the Wu River.

References

Buildings and structures in Liupanshui
Suspension bridges in China
Bridges in Guizhou
Bridges completed in 2016
2016 establishments in China